Tordehumos is a municipality located in the province of Valladolid, Castile and León, Spain. (INE), the municipality has a population of 463 inhabitants.

See also
Cuisine of the province of Valladolid

References

Municipalities in the Province of Valladolid